Deathstroke: Knights & Dragons - The Movie is a 2020 American direct-to-video adult animated superhero film based on the CW Seed series Deathstroke: Knights & Dragons, produced by Warner Bros. Animation, and distributed by Warner Bros. Home Entertainment. It was released digitally on August 4, 2020 and on Blu-ray on August 18.

Production
The film was originally announced as a 12-part series in April 2019, written by J.M. DeMatteis and directed by Sung Jin Ahn. The voice cast was also revealed. The first episode airing on CW Seed on January 6, 2020, but subsequent episodes never appeared.

The film version of the story was released on August 4, 2020, on Blu-ray and digital platforms with the same voice cast from the series.

Plot
In flashbacks, Slade Wilson is saved by an experimental drug following an accident from which he develops abilities (including super strength, enhanced agility, and regeneration) which he decides to use to become the mercenary "Deathstroke" with the help of his friend William Wintergreen. Slade then marries general Adeline "Addie" Kane who together have a son named Joseph. While on a mission in Cambodia as Deathstroke, he meets a woman named Lillian who he falls in love with. Unbeknownst to Slade, after he leaves completing his mission, Lillian gives birth to their daughter Rose who becomes orphaned after her mother dies in a hit and run. Ever since, Rose has lived alone until she is rescued by a mysterious man named Jackal, leader of the secret organization known as H.I.V.E., who trains her to one day become his successor. In the present-day, Joseph is kidnapped by Jackal. Slade returns home from one of his Deathstroke missions where he finds Addie, angered after she had discovered his Deathstroke identity which Slade kept a secret from his family. Slade promises to bring back Joseph and hunts down Jackal at his base of operations. There, Slade is confronted by Jackal's agents Bronze Tiger and an unnamed woman. Slade kills the woman but his arm gets locked by Tiger. Slade breaks free from Tiger's arm lock and heads to kill Jackal. Just before Slade can rescue Joseph, his throat is sliced making him mute. After Joseph becomes hospitalized, Addie breaks up with Slade for Joseph's safety. Kane then isolates Joseph at a private school to hide him from Slade.

Ten years later, Slade continues operating as Deathstroke. One night, he is contacted by the H.I.V.E. Queen - H.I.V.E.'s new leader - who has Joseph hostage for his psychic abilities, which he inherited from Slade. This reunites him with Adeline, who wants to join Slade in rescuing Joseph but Slade is reluctant. Before Slade leaves, Adeline shares a kiss with him. Slade's hunt for the Queen leads him to Colonel Kapoor, a former agent of H.I.V.E. He gains intel from Kapoor taking him to Kaznia where he confronts Tiger, now a freelancer. During their confrontation, Tiger reveals that Jackal is alive and the Queen is located at the Kerguelen Islands. Wintergreen takes Slade there whereupon arrival is attacked by Sandra Woosan / Lady Shiva. Slade surrenders and is taken to the Queen. The Queen reveals she had trained Joseph to use his abilities as a weapon known as "Jericho". Slade rescues Joseph who reveals he has joined H.I.V.E. as Jericho and that the Queen is actually Slade's daughter Rose; his (Joseph's) sister. Slade is shot into the ocean but refuses to die and so uses his regeneration powers. Addie fishes him out revealing she had placed a tracking device, provided by Wintergreen, through a kiss they shared earlier. Slade tells of his affair with Lillian to Addie. Rose informs Jackal about Slade's supposed death, pleasing him and allowing them to continue their plan. She then later bonds and trains with Jericho. Jericho's powers become out of control but Rose stops him. Slade, Addie, and Wintergreen discover H.I.V.E.'s plan to use Jericho's abilities to control the world.

Jackal conducts a series of coordinated attacks across the United States as a distraction to lure the president out. However, Rose and Jericho betray Jackal believing Jackal had manipulated them into becoming rogue. Rose orders Jericho to use his abilities to take Jackal's mind but Jackal had prepared and fights back. Slade and Addie then board the plane and confront Jackal and Shiva. Shiva holds Rose and Jericho hostage with Jackal blackmailing Slade to see which one dies first. Instead, Slade heads to fight Jackal while Addie fights Shiva but Rose kills her. During Slade and Jackal's fight, Jackal reveals that the woman who Slade killed while rescuing Joseph from him was Jackal's daughter hence why he took Slade's children under his wing. Just before Jackal uses his armor's powers to kill Slade, Slade redirects the blast leaving an opening in the plane prompting Slade and Jackal to fall out of it. While falling, Slade places a bomb on Jackal, killing them both.

Back home, Jericho remembers the story "Knights & Dragons" Slade read to him as a child. Addie officially welcomes Rose into the Wilson family. At a beach elsewhere, Slade's body is washed up and appears to still be alive.

Cast
 Michael Chiklis as Slade Wilson / Deathstroke
 Sasha Alexander as Adeline "Addie" Kane
 Chris Jai Alex as Jackal
 Faye Mata as H.I.V.E. Queen / Rose
 Griffin Puatu as Joseph Wilson / Jericho
 Asher Bishop as Young Joseph Wilson
 Imari Williams as President Nicholas
 Colin Salmon as William Wintergreen
 Delbert Hunt as Bronze Tiger
 Panta Mosleh as Lady Shiva
 Noshir Dalal as Kapoor
 Castulo Guerra as General Suarez
 Minae Noji as Secretary of State and Bora

Reception 

Deathstroke: Knights & Dragons earned $4,012,097 form domestic Blu-ray sales.

References

External links
 

2020 animated films
2020s American animated films
2020s direct-to-video animated superhero films
2020 direct-to-video films
2020 films
Adult animated superhero films
American superhero films
American adult animated films
Animated films based on DC Comics
2020s English-language films